Syritta noona is a species of syrphid fly in the family Syrphidae.

Distribution
New Ireland.

References

Eristalinae
Diptera of Australasia
Insects described in 2005